Olney is an unincorporated community in western Lincoln County, Missouri, United States. It is located on Missouri Supplemental Route O, approximately twelve miles northwest of Troy.

History
Olney was originally called Nineveh, and under the latter name was platted in 1855. The post office at Olney has been in operation since 1876. It is unclear why the name Olney was chosen to rename the community.

References

Unincorporated communities in Lincoln County, Missouri
Unincorporated communities in Missouri